Sensualidad (Sensuality) is a 1951 Mexican drama film directed by Alberto Gout, starring Ninón Sevilla and Fernando Soler.

Plot
The rumba dancer and singer Aurora (Ninón Sevilla), is sentenced to two years in prison for her part in a robbery with her boyfriend, the pimp "El Rizos" (Rodolfo Acosta). Once out of prison, Aurora and "El Rizos" decide to take revenge of the respectable judge Alejandro Luque (Fernando Soler), responsible for sending her to prison. Fate reunites Aurora and the judge, and she decides to seduce him. Without knowing the trap, the judge falls under the spell of the evil woman, forgetting everything important to him: his family and his profession. The judge degenerates to the point of killing and stealing to be near her. His son, Raul Luque (Ruben Rojo), begins investigating the situation, and like his father, falls in love with the perverse woman.

Cast
 Ninón Sevilla as Aurora
 Fernando Soler as Judge Alejandro Luque
 Rodolfo Acosta as "El Rizos"
 Rubén Rojo as  Raúl Luque
 Andrea Palma as Eulalia
 Andres Soler as Martínez

Production notes
The journalist Raymond Borde wrote for Postif magazine: "In this story, Ninon Sevilla is so evil. She seduces the actor Fernando Soler, the prototype of the Mexican respectable parent: she humiliates him, degraded him, causing him sexually. The sexual frustration of the unbalanced man makes him a likely murderer; his fate is uncertain".

The film starred Ninon Sevilla. It was written by the Spaniard Alvaro Custodio. The technical merits of the film and character development led the film to become a hit. The film was released in France, where it was recognized by most critics. François Truffaut, critic of Cahiers du Cinéma, wrote many articles about  this exotic unique subgenre of the Cinema of Mexico.

The artist José Luis Cuevas said: "Ninon Sevilla can get to the worst scoundrel as in Sensualidad. In Aventurera, is the victim, but in Sensualidad she's not. This, to the French, seemed surrealism. They loved it. A species of the Marquis de Sade to the bourgeois morality".

References

External links
 
 Tras las turquesas cortinas: Fantoscopá mexicana, Sensualidad (1951)

1951 films
Mexican black-and-white films
Mexican drama films
Rumberas films
1950s Spanish-language films
1951 drama films
Films directed by Alberto Gout
1950s Mexican films